John Creasey  (17 September 1908 – 9 June 1973) was an English crime writer, also writing science fiction, romance and western novels, who wrote more than six hundred novels using twenty-eight different pseudonyms.

He created several characters who are now famous, such as The Toff (The Honourable Richard Rollison), Commander George Gideon of Scotland Yard, Inspector Roger West, The Baron (John Mannering), Doctor Emmanuel Cellini and Doctor Stanislaus Alexander Palfrey. The most popular of these was Gideon of Scotland Yard, who was the basis for the television series Gideon's Way and for the John Ford movie  Gideon's Day (1958). The Baron character was also made into a 1960s TV series starring Steve Forrest as The Baron.

Life and career

John Creasey was born in Southfields, London Borough of Wandsworth (formerly part of Surrey), to a working-class family. He was the seventh of nine children of Ruth and Joseph Creasey, a poor coach maker. Creasey was educated at Fulham Elementary School and Sloane School, both in London. From 1923 to 1935 he worked various clerical, factory, and sales jobs while trying to establish himself as a writer. After a number of rejections, Creasey's first book was published in 1930. His first crime novel, Seven Times Seven, was published in January 1932 by Melrose. It was a story about a gang of criminals. In 1935 he became a full-time writer. In 1937 alone, twenty-nine of his books were published. A phenomenally fast writer, he once suggested that he could be shut up in a glass-box and write there a whole book.

In 1938, he created the character The Toff with the first novel Introducing the Toff. The Toff series would continue for 59 novels from 1938 to 1978. The Toff, The Honourable Richard Rollison, is an aristocrat and an amateur sleuth. ("Toff" is a British slang expression for an aristocrat.)

During World War II, he created the character of Dr. Stanislaus Alexander Palfrey, a British secret service agent, who forms Z5, a secret underground group that owes its allegiance to the Allies. The first novel of the Dr. Palfrey 34-book series was Traitor's Doom, published in 1942 by John Long Ltd., while the last was The Whirlwind in 1979.

Several adaptations were made of Creasey's novels. On film these included: Salute the Toff (1952, also known as Brighthaven Express in the USA), Hammer the Toff (1952), John Ford's Gideon's Day (1958, also known as Gideon of Scotland Yard in the USA), released by Columbia Pictures, and Cat & Mouse (1958, also known as The Desperate Men in the USA), written as Michael Halliday. On television, a series based on the Commander George Gideon character, Gideon's Way, was produced from 1964 to 1965 by ITC Entertainment and starring John Gregson in the title rôle. ITC followed this with a version of Creasey's The Baron character (1965–66), starring Steve Forrest. Between 1967 and 1971 the BBC produced a radio version of Creasey's Roger West stories with actor Patrick Allen in the title role as Scotland Yard Chief Inspector Roger "Handsome" West, with Allen's real-life wife Sarah Lawson playing the role of West's wife Janet.

In 1962, Creasey won an Edgar Award for Best Novel, from the Mystery Writers of America (MWA), for Gideon's Fire, written under the pseudonym J. J. Marric. In 1969 he received the MWA's greatest honour, the Grand Master Award. He served one term as president of the organization in 1966, one of only three non-American writers to be so honoured.

Creasey had as many publishers as he had pseudonyms, but enjoyed enduring relations with John Long and Hodder & Stoughton in the UK. After he finally broke into the American market in the 1950s, many of his books were released by Harper and Scribners; Walker reissued many older titles in the revised editions.

During the 1940s, Creasey was living at "Cattistock", Fernlea Avenue, Ferndown, Wimborne in Dorset. He died at his home New Hall, which is now New Hall Hospital, Bodenham near Salisbury, Wiltshire in 1973.

In 2007, his family transferred all of Creasey's copyrights and other legal rights to Owatonna Media. Owatonna Media on-sold these copyrights to Coolabi Plc in 2009, but retained a master licence in radio and audio rights. These rights are commercially licensed in the UK and abroad.

Richard Creasey
John's son Richard Creasey is also an author as well as a distinguished television producer, having served both in the private sector and at the BBC, and as the British producer of Patrick Watson's worldwide Canadian television documentary series The Struggle for Democracy. He has developed his father's "Doctor Palfrey" series by penning a new series of techno-thrillers around the character of Doctor Thomas Palfrey.

Crime Writers' Association (CWA)

In 1953, John Creasey founded the Crime Writers' Association (CWA) in the UK. The CWA New Blood Dagger is awarded in his memory, for first books by previously unpublished writers; sponsored by BBC Audiobooks, it includes a prize of £1000. This award was known previously as the John Creasey Memorial Dagger.

Pseudonyms
His pseudonyms include:

 Gordon Ashe
 Henry St. John Cooper
 Credo
 Norman Deane
 Robert Caine Frazer
 Patrick Gill
 Michael Halliday
 Charles Hogarth (with Ian Bowen)
 Brian Hope
 Colin Hughes
 Kyle Hunt
 Abel Mann
 Peter Manton
 J.J. Marric
 James Marsden
 Richard Martin
 Rodney Mattheson
 Anthony Morton
 Henry St. John
 Martin Richard
 Jeremy York

In addition, he wrote Westerns under the names of Ken Ranger, Tex Riley, William K. Reilly, and Jimmy Wilde.  He also wrote Romantic novels under the names of Margaret Cooke, M.E. Cooke, and Elise Fecamps.

Political career

As well as being an author, Creasey was a committed Liberal party member though he later became an independent. He said that he had been organising Liberal street-corner meetings from the age of 12. At the time of the 1945 general election Creasey was Chairman of the local Liberal Association in Bournemouth where his publicity and writing skills were instrumental in helping the Liberals to an atypical second place. He was adopted as prospective parliamentary candidate for Bournemouth West in 1946 and appeared on the platform at the 1947 Liberal Assembly, which was held in Bournemouth.

He fought Bournemouth West in the 1950 general election, coming third. He became increasingly unhappy with the party through the 1950s though and disagreed so much with the party's policy concerning the Suez Crisis he resigned his membership. However, after the Orpington by-election success of 1962 and impressed with Jo Grimond's leadership of the party he seemed to be reviving his Liberal activity. By January 1966 however, he had founded the All Party Alliance, a pressure group which sought to unite the best people from all parties.

The platform of the All Party Alliance was based on running industry by councils made up of workers, managers, investors and government to avoid industrial action, with a mind to eventually eliminate income tax.

Creasey fought by-elections as an independent in support of this idea around 1967 at Nuneaton, Brierley Hill and Manchester Gorton.  He also fought Oldham West during the by-election of June 1968. He did well for an independent with the first-past-the-post system, having limited resources and often little time to campaign.

In Oldham West he beat his old party's candidate into fourth place. He could not seem to shed his affection for the Liberal party however, congratulating Birmingham Ladywood by-election victor Wallace Lawler in July 1969 and attending the 1969 party assembly albeit to promote All Party Alliance aims.

In 1972 he relaunched the All Party Alliance as Evolution to Democracy (Evo). Evo merged with Colin Campion's "The Organisation", a Yorkshire-based party which advocated coalition governments based on the proportion of votes cast for each party, to form the "Independent Democratic Alliance", which soon faded after Creasey's death, and its poor performance in the February 1974 general election.

John Creasey features in the Look At Life film I Protest! where he is seen collecting signatures for a petition to lobby the government to take action against the number of deaths due to road accidents.

Honours

He was awarded the Member of the Order of the British Empire (MBE) for services in the United Kingdom's National Savings Movement during World War II.

Bibliography

The Commander George Gideon series (published under the pseudonym "J. J. Marric," 1955–1976) 

 Gideon's Day (1955) a.p.a. Gideon of Scotland Yard
 Gideon's Week (1956) a.p.a. 7 Days to Death
 Gideon's Night (1957) 
 Gideon's Month (1958) 
 Gideon's Staff (1959) 
 Gideon's Risk (1960) 
 Gideon's Fire (1961) 
 Gideon's March (1962) 
 Gideon's Ride (1963) 
 Gideon's Vote (1964) 
 Gideon's Lot (1965) 
 Gideon's Badge (1966) 
 Gideon's Wrath (1967) 
 Gideon's River (1968) 
 Gideon's Power (1969) 
 Gideon's Sport (1970) 
 Gideon's Art (1971) 
 Gideon's Men (1972) 
 Gideon's Press (1973) 
 Gideon's Fog (1975) 
 Gideon's Drive (1976)

The series was continued after Creasey's death by William Vivian Butler ("as J.J. Marric"):
 Gideon's Force (1978)
 Gideon's Law (1981)
 Gideon's Way (1983)
 Gideon's Raid (1986)
 Gideon's Fear (1990)

Dr. Palfrey (Z5) series, writing as John Creasey (1942–1979)

 Traitor's Doom (November 1942)
 The Valley of Fear (May 1943) a.p.a. The Perilous Country 
 The Legion of the Lost (November 1943)
 Dangerous Quest (1944)
 Death in the Rising Sun (1945)
 The Hounds of Vengeance (1945)
 Shadow of Doom (1946)
 The House of the Bears (1946)
 Dark Harvest (1947)
 The Wings of Peace (1948)
 The Sons of Satan (1948)
 The Dawn of Darkness (1949)
 The League of Light (1949)
 The Man Who Shook the World (1950)
 The Prophet of Fire (1951)
 The Children of Hate (1952) a.p.a. The Killers of Innocence
 The Touch of Death (1954)
 The Mists of Fear (1955)
 The Flood (1956)
 The Plague of Silence (1958)
 The Drought (1959) a.p.a. Dry Spell
 The Terror (1962)
 The Depths (1963)
 The Sleep (1964)
 The Inferno (1965)
 The Famine (1967)
 The Blight (1968)
 The Oasis (1969)
 The Smog (1970)
 The Unbegotten (1971)
 The Insulators (1972)
 The Voiceless Ones (1973)
 The Thunder-Maker (1976)
 The Whirlwind (1979)

Four additional Z5 stories have been written by the author's son Richard; in these, the central figure is Thomas Palfrey, the doctor's grandson: Eternity's Sunrise (2012); Hard Targets (2013, an omnibus of three shorter adventures – "Wings of Fear," "Burning Night," and "Deadly Sleep").

The Department Z series, as John Creasey (1933–1957) 

 The Death Miser (1933)
 Redhead (1933)
 First Came a Murder (1934)
 Death 'Round the Corner (1935)
 The Mark of the Crescent (1935)
 Thunder in Europe (1936)
 The Terror Trap (1936)
 Carriers of Death (1937)
 Days of Danger (1937)
 Death Stands By (1938)
 Menace! (1938)
 Murder Must Wait (1939)
 Panic! (1939)
 Death by Night (1940)
 The Island of Peril (1940)
 Sabotage (1941)
 Go Away Death (1941)
 The Day of Disaster (1942)
 Prepare for Action (1942)
 No Darker Crime (1943)
 Dark Peril (1944)
 The Peril Ahead (1946)
 The League of Dark Men (1947)
 The Department of Death (1949)
 The Enemy Within (1950)
 Dead or Alive (1951)
 A Kind of Prisoner (1954)
 The Black Spiders (1957)

Chief Inspector Roger West series, as John Creasey (1942–1978)

 Inspector West Takes Charge (1942)
 Inspector West Leaves Town (1943) a.k.a. Go Away to Murder (1972)
 Inspector West at Home (1944) (Adapted for BBC Radio starring Patrick Allen)
 Inspector West Regrets (1945)
 Holiday for Inspector West (1946)
 Battle for Inspector West (1948) Adapted for BBC Radio starring Patrick Allen)
 Triumph for Inspector West (1948) a.k.a. The Case Against Paul Raeburn (1958)
 Inspector West Kicks Off (1949) a.k.a. Sport for inspector West (1971)
 Inspector West Alone (1950)
 Inspector West Cries Wolf (1950) a.k.a. The Creepers (1952) (Adapted for BBC Radio starring Patrick Allen)
 A Case for Inspector West (1951) a.k.a. The Figure in the Dusk (1952)
 Puzzle for Inspector West (1951) a.k.a. The Dissemblers (1967)
 Inspector West at Bay (1952) a.k.a. The Blind Spot (1954), a.k.a. The Case of the Acid Throwers (1960) (Adapted for BBC Radio starring Patrick Allen)
 A Gun for Inspector West (1953) a.k.a. Give a Man a Gun (1954)
 Send Inspector West (1953)  a.k.a. Send Superintendent West
 A Beauty for Inspector West (1954) a.k.a. The Beauty Queen Killer (1956), a.k.a. So Young, So Cold, So Fair (1958) (Adapted for BBC Radio starring Patrick Allen)
 Inspector West Makes Haste (1955) a.k.a. Murder Makes Haste (1955), a.k.a. The Gelignite Gang (1956), a.k.a. Night of the Watchman (1966) (Adapted for BBC Radio starring Patrick Allen)
 Two for Inspector West (1955) a.k.a. Murder: One, Two, Three (1960),  Murder Tips the Scales (1962)
 Parcels for Inspector West (1956) a.k.a. Death of an Assassin (1960)
 A Prince for Inspector West (1956)
 Accident for Inspector West (1957) a.k.a. Hit and Run (1959)
 Find Inspector West (1957) a.k.a. The Trouble at Saxby's (1959), a.k.a. Doorway to Death (1961)
 Murder, London – New York (1958)
 Strike for Death (1958) a.k.a. The Killing Strike (1961)
 Death of a Racehorse (1959)
 The Case of the Innocent Victims (1959)
 Murder on the Line (1960)
 Death in Cold Print (1961)
 The Scene of the Crime (1961)
 Policeman's Dread (1962)
 Hang the Little Man (1963)
 Look Three Ways at Murder (1964)
 Murder, London – Australia (1965)
 Murder, London – South Africa (1966)
 The Executioners (1967)
 So Young to Burn (1968)
 Murder, London – Miami (1969)
 A Part for a Policeman (1970)
 Alibi (1971) a.k.a. Alibi for Inspector West (1973)
 A Splinter of Glass (1972)
 The Theft of Magna Carta (1973) a.k.a. Theft of Magna Carta (1973)
 The Extortioners (1974)
 A Sharp Rise in Crime (1978)

The Toff series, as John Creasey (1938–1978)

 Introducing the Toff (1938)
 The Toff Goes On (1939)
 The Toff Steps Out (1939)
 Here Comes the Toff (1940)
 The Toff Breaks In (1940)
 Salute the Toff (1941)
 The Toff Proceeds (1941)
 The Toff Goes to Market (1942)
 The Toff Is Back (1942)
 The Toff Among Millions (1943)
 Accuse the Toff (1943)
 The Toff and the Curate (1944) a.k.a. The Toff and the Deadly Parson
 The Toff and the Great Illusion (1944)
 Feathers for the Toff (1945)
 The Cinema Crimes (1945)
 The Toff and the Lady (1946)
 The Toff on Ice (1946) a.k.a. Poison for The Toff
 Hammer the Toff (1947)
 The Toff in Town (1947)
 The Toff Takes Shares (1948)
 The Toff and Old Harry (1949)
 The Toff on Board (1949)
 Fool the Toff (1950)
 Kill the Toff (1950)
 A Knife for the Toff (1951)
 The Toff Goes Gay (1951) a.k.a. A Mask for the Toff
 Hunt the Toff (1952)
 Call the Toff (1953)
 The Toff Down Under (1953) a.k.a. Break the Toff
 Murder Out of the Past (1953)
 The Toff at Butlin's (1954)
 The Toff at the Fair (1954) a.k.a. Last Laugh For The Toff
 A Six for the Toff (1955) a.k.a. A Score for the Toff
 The Toff and the Deep Blue Sea (1955)
 Make-Up for the Toff (1956) a.k.a. Kiss the Toff
 The Toff in New York (1956)
 Model for the Toff (1957)
 The Toff on Fire (1957)
 The Toff and the Stolen Tresses (1958)
 The Toff on the Farm (1958) a.k.a. Terror for the Toff
 Double for the Toff (1959)
 The Toff and the Runaway Bride (1959)
 A Rocket for the Toff (1960)
 The Toff and the Kidnapped Child (1960) a.k.a. The Kidnapped Child
 Follow the Toff (1961)
 The Toff and the Teds (1961) a.k.a. The Toff and the Toughs
 A Doll for the Toff (1959)
 Leave It to the Toff (1962)
 The Toff and the Spider (1965)
 The Toff in Wax (1966)
 A Bundle for the Toff (1967)
 Stars for the Toff (1968)
 The Toff and the Golden Boy (1969)
 The Toff and the Fallen Angels (1970)
 Vote for the Toff (1971)
 The Toff and the Trip-Trip-Triplets (1972)
 The Toff and the Terrified Taxman (1973)
 The Toff and the Sleepy Cowboy (1974)
 The Toff and the Crooked Copper (1977)
 The Toff and the Dead Man's Finger (1978; written by William Vivian Butler)

Sexton Blake series, writing as John Creasey (1937–1943)

 The Case of the Murdered Financier (1937)
 The Great Air Swindle (1939)
 The Man from Fleet Street (1940)
 The Case of the Mad Inventor (1942)
 Private Carter's Crime (1943)

Standalone novels, as John Creasey 

 Seven Times Seven (1932)
 Men, Maids and Murder (1933)
 The Men Who Died Laughing (1935)
 Yesterday's Murder (1945)
 The Mountain of the Blind (1960)
 The Foothills of Fear (1961)
 The Masters of Bow Street (1972)

The Baron series (under the pseudonym "Anthony Morton," 1937–1979) 

 Meet the Baron (1937) (U.S. title The Man in the Blue Mask)
 The Baron Returns (1937) (U.S. title The Return of Blue Mask)
 The Baron Again (1938) (U.S. title Salute Blue Mask)
 The Baron at Bay (1938) (U.S. title Blue Mask at Bay)
 Alias the Baron (1939) (U.S. title Alias Blue Mask)
 The Baron at Large (1939) (U.S. title Challenge Blue Mask)
 Versus the Baron (1940) (U.S. title Blue Mask Strikes Again)
 Call for the Baron (1940) (U.S. title Blue Mask Victorious)
 The Baron Comes Back (1943)
 A Case for the Baron (1945)
 Reward for the Baron (1945)
 Career for the Baron (1946)
 The Baron and the Beggar (1947)
 A Rope for the Baron (1948)
 Blame the Baron (1948)
 Books for the Baron (1949)
 Cry for the Baron (1950)
 Trap the Baron (1950)
 Attack the Baron (1951)
 Shadow the Baron (1951)
 Warn the Baron (1952)
 The Baron Goes East (1953)
 The Baron in France (1953)
 Danger for the Baron (1953)
 The Baron Goes Fast (1954)
 Nest-Egg for the Baron (1954) (U.S. title Deaf, Dumb and Blonde)
 Help from the Baron (1955)
 Hide the Baron (1956)
 Frame the Baron (1957) (U.S. title The Double Frame)
 Red Eye for the Baron (1958) (U.S. title Blood Red)
 Black for the Baron (1959) (U.S. title If Anything Happens to Hester)
 Salute for the Baron (1960)
 A Branch for the Baron (1961) (U.S. title The Baron Branches Out)
 Salute for the Baron (1960)
 A Branch for the Baron (1961) (U.S. title The Baron Branches Out)
 Bad for the Baron (1962) (U.S. title The Baron and the Stolen Legacy)
 A Sword for the Baron (1963) (U.S. title The Baron and the Mogul Swords)
 The Baron on Board (1964)
 The Baron and the Chinese Puzzle (1965)
 Sport for the Baron (1966)
 Affair for the Baron (1967)
 The Baron and the Missing Old Masters (1968)
 The Baron and the Unfinished Portrait (1969)
 Last Laugh for the Baron (1970)
 The Baron Goes A-Buying (1971)
 The Baron and the Arrogant Artist (1972)
 Burgle the Baron (1973)
 The Baron, King-Maker (1975)
 Love for the Baron (1979)

The Bruce Murdoch series (under the pseudonym "Norman Deane," 1939–1942) 

 Secret Errand (1939)
 Dangerous Journey (1939)
 Unknown Mission (1940)
 The Withered Man (1940)
 I Am the Withered Man (1941)
 Where is the Withered Man (1942)

The Liberator series (as "Norman Deane," 1943–1945) 

 Return to Adventure (1943)
 Gateway to Escape (1944)
 Come Home to Crime (1945)

The Mark Kilby series (under the pseudonym "Robert Caine Frazer," 1959–1964) 

 Mark Kilby Solves a Murder (1959) a.p.a. R.I.S.C. (1962), a.p.a. The Timid Tycoon (1966)
 Mark Kilby and the Secret Syndicate (1960)
 Mark Kilby and the Miami Mob (1960)
 Mark Kilby Stands Alone (1962)
 Mark Kilby Takes a Risk (1962)
 The Hollywood Hoax (1964)

The Superintendent Folly series (under the pseudonym "Jeremy York," 1942–1948) 

In the asterisked titles, Folly was added for the revised editions of novels originally written as standalones.

 Foul Play Suspected (1942) *
 Murder in the Family (1944)*
 Crime With Many Voices (1945) *
 No Crime More Cruel (1945) *
 Find the Body (1945)
 Murder Came Late (1946)
 Mystery Motive (1947) *
 Run Away to Murder (1947)
 First a Murder (1947)
 Close the Door on Murder (1948)
 Let's Kill Uncle Lionel (1948)
 The Gallows are Waiting (1948) *

The Fane Brothers series 
Written under the pseudonym "Michael Halliday" for UK publication (1952–1955), but published under the pseudonym "Jeremy York" in the US (all in 1972).

 Take a Body (1952)
 Murder in the Stars (1953)
 Man on the Run (1953)
 Lame Dog Murder (1955)

The Doctor Cellini series 
Written under the pseudonym "Michael Halliday" for UK publication (1965–1975), but published under the pseudonym "Kyle Hunt" for US.

 Cunning as a Fox (1965)
 Wicked as the Devil (1966)
 Sly as a Serpent (1967)
 Cruel as a Cat (1968)
 Too Good to Be True (1969)
 A Period of Evil (1970 in UK, 1971 in US)
 As Lonely as the Damned (1971 in UK, 1972 in US)
 As Empty as Hate (1972)
 As Merry as Hell (1972 in UK, 1973 in US)
 This Man Did I Kill? (1974)
 The Man Who Was Not Himself (1975)

Standalone novels (as "Jeremy York," 1941–1960) 

 By Persons Unknown (1941)
 Murder Unseen (1943)
 No Alibi (1944)
 Yesterday's Murder (1945)
 Wilful Murder (1946)
 Death to My Killer (1950)
 Sentence of Death (1950)
 Voyage of Death (1952)a.p.a. Voyage with Murder
 Safari with Murder (1953)a.p.a. Safari with Fear
 So Soon to Die (1955)
 Seeds of Murder (1956)
 Sight of Death (1956)
 My Brother's Killer (1958)
 Hide and Kill (1959)
 To Kill or to Die (1960)a.p.a. To Kill or Die

Standalone novels (written under the pseudonym "Peter Manton," 1937–1954) 

 The Greyvale School Mystery (1937)
 Murder Manor (1937)
 Stand By for Danger (1937)
 Circle of Justice (1938)
 Three Days' Terror (1938)
 The Crime Syndicate (1939)
 Death Looks On (1039)
 Murder in the Highlands (1939)
 The Midget Marvel (1940)
 Policeman's Triumph (1948)
 Thief in the Night (1950)
 No Escape from Murder (1953)
 The Charity Killers (1954)
 The Crooked Killer (1954)

The Patrick Dawlish Series (written under the pseudonym "Gordon Ashe," 1939–1975) 

 The Speaker (1939)
 Death on Demand (1939)
 Terror by Day (1940)
 Secret Murder (1940)
 'Ware Danger (1941)
 Murder Most Foul (1941)
 There Goes Death (1942)
 Death in High Places (1942)
 Death in Flames (1943)
 Two Men Missing (1943)
 Rogues Rampant (1944)
 Death on the Move (1945)
 Invitation to Adventure (1946)
 Here is Danger (1946)
 Give Me Murder (1947)
 Murder Too Late (1947)
 Engagement with Death (1948)
 Dark Mystery (1948)
 A Puzzle in Pearls (1949)
 Kill or Be Killed (1949)
 Murder with Mushrooms (1950)
 The Dark Circle (1951)
 Death in Diamonds (1951)
 Missing or Dead (1951)
 Death in a Hurry (1952)
 Sleepy Death (1953)
 The Long Search (1953) (U.S. title Drop Dead, 1954)
 Death in the Trees (1954)
 Double for Death (1954)
 The Kidnapped Child (1955) (a.p.a. The Snatch)
 Day of Fear (1956)
 Wait for Death (1957)
 Come Home to Death (1958) (U.S. title The Pack of Lies, 1959)
 Elope to Death (1959)
 Don't Let Him Kill (1960) (U.S. title The Man Who Laughed at Murder, 1960)
 The Crime Haters (1961)
 Rogues' Ransom (1962)
 Death from Below (1963)
 The Big Call (1964)
 A Promise of Diamonds (1964)
 A Taste of Treasure (1966)
 A Clutch of Coppers (1967)
 A Shadow of Death (1968)
 A Scream Of Murder (1969)
 A Nest of Traitors (1970)
 A Rabble of Rebels (1971)
 A Life for a Death (1972)
 A Herald of Doom (1973)
 A Blast of Trumpets (1974)
 A Plague of Demons (1975)

Standalone novels (as "Gordon Ashe," 1940–1957) 

 Who Was the Jester? (1940)
 The Man Who Stayed Alive (1955)
 No Need to Die (1956)
 You Bet Your Life (1957)

Standalone novels (as "Abel Mann," 1966) 

 Danger Woman (1966)

Westerns (various pseudonyms)
One-Shot Marriott and Roaring Guns were written under the pseudonym "Ken Ranger"; the rest were written under the pseudonyms "Tex Riley" (asterisked below) or "William K. Riley" (indicated below by # sign after date of publication).

 Gun-Smoke Range (1938) *
 One-Shot Marriott (1938)
 Two-Gun Girl (1938) *
 Roaring Guns (1939) 
 Gunshot Mesa (1939) *
 Range War (1939) #
 Two Gun Texan (1939) #
 Gun Feud (1940) #
 Masked Riders (1940) *
 Rustler's Range (1940) *
 The Shootin' Sheriff (1940) *
 Stolen Range (1940) #
 Outlaw's Vengeance (1941) #
 War on the Lazy-K (1941) #
 Death Canyon (1941) *
 Guns on the Range (1942) *
 Guns over Blue Lake (1942) #
 Riders of Dry Gulch (1943) #
 Range Justice (1943) *
 Long John Rides the Range (1944) #
 Outlaw Hollow (1944) *
 Miracle Range (1945) #
 Hidden Range (1946) *
 The Secrets of the Range (1946) #
 Forgotten Range (1947) *
 Trigger Justice (1948) *
 Bullet Justice (1949) *
 Lynch Hollow (1949) *
 Outlaw Guns (1949) #
 Range Vengeance (1953) #

Romance novels (various pseudonyms)
Those indicated by "1" after the publication date were written under the pseudonym "Margaret Cooke"; those indicated by "2" after the publication date were written under the pseudonym "Elise Fecamps"; those indicated by "3" after the publication date were written under the pseudonym "Henry St John Cooper".

 For Love's Sake (1934) 1
 Lover of Hate (1936) 2
 False Love or True (1937) 1
 Troubled Journey (1937) 1
 Love's Triumph (1937) 2
 True Love (1937) 2
 Chains of Love (1937) 3
 Love's Pilgrimage (1937) 3
 A Mannequin's Romance (1938) 1
 Fate's Playthings (1938) 1
 Love Calls Twice (1938) 1
 The Road to Happiness (1938) 1
 Web of Destiny (1938) 1
 Whose Lover? (1938) 1
 The Greater Desire (1938) 3
 The Tangled Legacy (1938) 3
 The Turn of Fate (1939) 1
 Crossroads of Love (1939) 1
 Love Comes Back (1939) 1
 Love Triumphant (1939) 1
 Love's Ordeal (1939) 3
 Love's Journey (1940) 1
 The Lost Lover (1940) 3

Footnotes

External links
Biography and bibliography at Creasey copyright holder Owatonna Media (owatonnamedia.co.uk)
"John Creasey – Ten Authors in One" at The Hitchhiker's Guide to the Galaxy: Earth Edition (h2g2.com)
The John Creasey Online Resource (johncreasey.co.uk) – fan site
 

  of works catalogued under his own name and several pseudonyms, and links to many others
 As of October 2018, the Library of Congress assigns LCCN to, or identifies, about 20 pseudonyms, and evidently catalogues some works under about 10 of them.

1908 births
1973 deaths
English crime fiction writers
Edgar Award winners
Liberal Party (UK) parliamentary candidates
Members of the Order of the British Empire
20th-century English novelists
British detective fiction writers
English male novelists
20th-century English male writers
Authors of Sexton Blake